Lantouri is a 2016 Iranian drama film written, directed and produced by Reza Dormishian. It was shown in the Panorama section at the 66th Berlin International Film Festival and in the Discoveries section of the 32nd Warsaw Film Festival. The film covers the story of throwing acid to the face of a young active journalist by a young man "Pasha" who is a leader of a gang of thieves and blackmailers. A gang that all of its members have been affected by injustice experiences in society.

Plot
Pasha, the leader of the gang of Lantouri, falls in love with Maryam, a social activist and  journalist who has started a campaign called "No to Violence" in order to convince the families of the crime victims to forgive the murderers of their love ones. Maryam rejects repeatedly Pasha‘s love and his feeling for her. Pasha loses his mind because of the rejection, splashes acid on Maryam‘s face and she loses her sight because of what Pasha did to her. Now, Maryam who previously convincing others to forgive criminals asks for justice and revenge, and requests “eye for eye” punishment.

Cast
 Navid Mohammadzadeh as Pasha
 Maryam Palizban as Maryam
 Baran Kosari as Baran
 Mehdi Koushki
 Bahram Afshari
 Behrang Alavi as Saeed (Maryam's friend)
 Reza Behboudi
 Behnaz Jafari
 Fatemeh Naghavi
 Parivash Nazarieh
 Nader Falah
 Hojjat Hassanpour Sargaroui as Alireza
 Ardeshir Rostami
 Hossein Pakdel
 Setareh Pesyani

Awards and nominations 
 17th Hafez Awards Celebration, Abbas Kiarostami Memorial Medal Award, 2016 
 17th Buenos Aires International Human Rights Film Festival, Best Picture Film Award, 2017 
 34th Fajr International Film Festival, nominated for Crystal Simorq Award for Best Make-up artist, for Abdollah Eskandari and Mehrdad Mirkiani, 2016
 34th Fajr International Film Festival, nominated for Crystal Simorq Award for Best Edith, for Hayedeh Safiyari, 2016
 34th Fajr International Film Festival, Crystal Simorq Award for Best Sound, for Mohammad Reza Delpak, Saeed Bojnoordi, Hossein Mahdavi, 2016 
32nd Warsaw International Film Festival, Competition 1-2, 2016 
31st Mar del Plata International Film Festival, Special Screenings, Argentina, 2016

References

External links
 Official Trailer
 Lantouri on Facebook
 

2016 films
2016 drama films
Iranian drama films
2010s Persian-language films